Allan Anthony Costly Blyden (born 13 December 1954) is a Honduran former footballer who played at both professional and international levels, as a defender.

Career
Born in Tela, Costly played club football in Honduras Tela Timsa, Real España and Petrotela. He also had a spell in Spain with CD Málaga.

International career
Nicknamed Cochero ("The Coachman"), Costly played at the 1977 FIFA World Youth Championship, and represented his country in 18 FIFA World Cup qualification matches and played at the 1982 FIFA World Cup. He earned a total of 41 caps, scoring 2 goals.

International goals
Scores and results list Honduras' goal tally first.

Personal life
His son is Honduran international striker Carlo Costly.

References

1954 births
Living people
People from Tela
Association football defenders
Honduran footballers
Honduras international footballers
1982 FIFA World Cup players
Real C.D. España players
CD Málaga footballers
Liga Nacional de Fútbol Profesional de Honduras players
La Liga players
Honduran expatriate footballers
Expatriate footballers in Spain
Honduran expatriate sportspeople in Spain
CONCACAF Championship-winning players